Launched at the 1970 São Paulo Auto Show, the Ford Landau was a full-size car, manufactured in Brazil from 1971 until 1983 by Ford Brasil at their São Paulo facility. It became Ford's flagship in that country. It was based on the U.S. 1966 Ford Galaxie.  It was only offered as a 4-door sedan, although the American version was offered in a wide variety of bodystyles.  After 1976, it gained more differences from the Galaxie and LTD, and featured the newly introduced 302 engine, a lighter 5.0L V8, and its radical restyling clearly resembling the 1965 Lincoln Continental.

American origin, Brazilian style 
The Landau joined the existing models Galaxie 500 and LTD in the showrooms in 1976 as Ford's new top-of-the-range model. Initially the Landau offered in the single colour scheme “Prata Continental” (Continental Silver), an exclusive metallic clearcoat. The vinyl roof was painted silver coloured too.

Trivia 
On June 25, 1979, during the oil crisis in Brazil, Ford includes in Galaxie/ Landau range an 302 CID engine with higher compression ratio (11,0:1 vs. 7,8:1), and that made use of true dual exhaust, aluminum intake manifold and nickel-covered carburetor, to accept the use of Ethanol (sugar cane alcohol). The first car was a present to the Brazilian president at the time, João Figueiredo.

From the total of 77,647 Galaxie versions built in Brazil in 16 years of market presence, 2492 units ran with alcohol as fuel.

Production figures 
 1971 – Unknown exactly.
 1972 – Unknown exactly.
 1973 – 3539.
 1974 – 3720.
 1975 – 2911.
 1976 – 5556.
 1977 – 2422.
 1978 – 3903.
 1979 – 4412 gasoline; 22 ethanol.
 1980 – 1390 gasoline; 1581 ethanol.
 1981 – 538 gasoline; 587 ethanol.
 1982 – 929 gasoline; 270 ethanol.
 1983 – 93 gasoline; 32 ethanol.

Until 1980, includes Ford LTD.

References

External links 
 .
 .
 .

Landau
1970s cars
1980s cars
Cars of Brazil
Rear-wheel-drive vehicles
Full-size vehicles